Judah Aryeh Loeb ben Zvi Hirsch of Carpentras was a French Hebraist.

Biography
Judah was born in Krotoschin, and lived at Avignon and Carpentras. He was the author of Ohole Yehudah, a Hebrew dictionary, in which special attention is paid to proper names and their etymology, and Geza' Yehudah, a short concordance. In his introduction to the former work he mentions two other works of his: Pene Aryeh and Ḥeleḳ Yehudah, both on the Pentateuch. The grammatical essay which preceded the Ḥeleḳ Yehudah was published with a German translation under the title Yesod leshon ha-ḳodesh. A Hebrew manuscript in the Bodleian Library contains a grammatical poem, beginning, and a commentary by Judah, to which are added the paradigms of the verbs, with a Hebrew-German translation, and some grammatical rules.

Publications

References
 

18th-century French Jews
18th-century German Jews
18th-century lexicographers
French Hebraists
French lexicographers
Grammarians of Hebrew
Jewish lexicographers
People from Krotoszyn
Writers from Avignon
People from Carpentras